Randolph "Buster" Murdaugh Jr. (January 15, 1915February 5, 1998) was an American attorney who served as the circuit solicitor of South Carolina's 14th judicial district from 1940 until his retirement in 1986. He was the second patriarch of the Murdaugh family from 1940 until the 1980s.

Early life, education, and early career
Randolph "Buster" Murdaugh Jr. was born in Varnville, South Carolina on January 15, 1915, to Randolph Murdaugh Sr. and  Etta Causey Harvey. He earned his law degree from the University of South Carolina in 1938, and afterward moved to Hampton, South Carolina to practice at law. He also worked for his father as an assistant solicitor and served as president of the Hampton County Young Democrats.

Circuit solicitor
Buster Murdaugh announced his campaign for the Democratic Party's nomination to succeeded his father, Randolph Murdaugh Sr., as Circuit solicitor of South Carolina's 14th judicial district a week after his death in July 1940. 
He won the 1940 special election and served until 1986. In his forty-six years in office, Buster ran opposed only twice. A few months after the death of his father, Buster sued Charleston and Western Carolina Railway, claiming that poor maintenance of the rail crossing had contributed to the accident causing his father's death. Although there were rumors that the crash was no accident, with some believing that MurdaughSr. intentionally stopped his car on the tracks to commit suicide or that the crash was alcohol-related, Charleston and Western Carolina RW settled the lawsuit for an undisclosed sum.

Buster was known for "his love of chewing tobacco, his courtroom prowess and his flair for acting out murders before spellbound juries". According to Professor John Blume of Cornell Law School, he was rebuked several times by the South Carolina Supreme Court for improper closing arguments in death penalty cases and for arguing in a rape case that if the defendant was acquitted he would release other accused rapists. In 1956 he was indicted by a federal grand jury for allegedly warning a bootlegger to move a moonshine still into a neighboring county to avoid the revenuers; he was acquitted.

Retirement and death
Buster retired in 1986 and was succeeded by his son, Randolph Murdaugh III. He died on February 5, 1998. His contributions to South Carolina were honored by a house resolution in the South Carolina House of Representatives during the 118th South Carolina legislature.

References

1915 births
1998 deaths
20th-century American politicians
Randolph Buster Murdaugh
People from Hampton County, South Carolina
South Carolina Democrats
South Carolina state solicitors
University of South Carolina School of Law alumni